Gerd Ellen "Lillemor" Gudding (15 November 1951 – 14 July 2015) was a Norwegian musician, fiddler, bass guitarist, and singer, married 9 June 1973 to the artist Øystein Dolmen (divorced).

Life
Gudding grew up in Oslo's Frogner neighborhood along with her sister Aase and brother Gunnar; their parents were from Trøndelag. She played violin in the band Veslefrikk at Majorstuen School. As a teenager she went to the Dolphin Club, where she became a fiddler in the band Christiania Fusel & Blaagress, playing together with Kari Svendsen and Øystein Sunde, among others. She later played with the band Knutsen & Ludvigsen and the group Bakklandet Bassangforening, where she played the character of Lina Larsen in their signature piece "Kristiansunds Nasjonalsang" (Kristiansund Anthem).

She also worked in customer service at the Brygge Theater and Oslo New Theater, and then worked at the Norwegian National Opera and Ballet.

Gudding died at age 63 on 14 July 2015 at the Lovisenberg Hospice.

Discography

With Bakklandet Bassangforening
Ned med Nidaros (1975)
Du milde Mosart (1977)

Other collaboration
 Øystein Sunde: Det året det var så bratt (1971)
 Convivium: Convivium (1971)
 Knutsen & Ludvigsen: Brunost no igjæn? (1972)
 Knutsen & Ludvigsen: Balladen om Nancy Drew/Rett West (1973)
 Knutsen & Ludvigsen: Knutsen og Ludvigsen nr. 3 – Tut (1974)
 Ivar Medaas: Vårteikn (1976)
 Stig Nilsson: Brunost og sirop og brø (1977)
 Christiania Fusel & Blaagress: Som varmt hvetebrød i tørt gress (reissued 1993)
 Knutsen & Ludvigsen: Knutsen & Ludvigsens beste (1996)
 Knutsen & Ludvigsen: Knutsen & Ludvigsens vær'ste (1997)
 Knutsen & Ludvigsen: Dum og deilig: Knutsen & Ludvigsens beste (2008)

References

External links
Aftenposten: Nekrolog: Gerd Gudding

20th-century Norwegian multi-instrumentalists
21st-century Norwegian multi-instrumentalists
Musicians from Oslo
Norwegian violinists
Norwegian bass guitarists
1951 births
2015 deaths
20th-century bass guitarists
21st-century Norwegian guitarists
20th-century Norwegian women singers
20th-century Norwegian singers
20th-century Norwegian women musicians
21st-century Norwegian women musicians
21st-century women guitarists